Ladies' Choice ( / Dami Kanyat) is a Bulgarian comedy film released in 1980, directed by Ivan Andonov, starring Stefan Danailov.

A charming driving instructor, divorced and poor, flirts with his numerous female students all of the time. No matter of age, occupation or marital status as if all the bored women in this town court this country "Don Juan". Finally, he loses control over the attacks of his suitors...

The film belongs to the group of the so-called Bulgarian Cult Comedies Stream that burst out during the first half of the 1980s but starting from the previous decade. Amidst the notable ones can be listed: Something out of Nothing (1979), The Double (1980), A Nameless Band (1982), Dangerous Charm (1984) and the sequence about The Past-Master (1970–1983)

Naturally, the film gave one of the all time famous quotes, as usual by the well-known Rusev and Todev.

Plot
The driving instructor Yakim Donev (Danailov) just divorced his wife leaving her all his modest assets. For giving the assets he is blamed by his uncle (Todev) every time when Donev visited him. The town in which he lives and works seems to be small and boring, so he initiates dalliances with his female students. There is no matter of age or occupancy, of physical appearance or marital status. All the women who tries to obtain a driving license becomes his suitors. The funny situations file one after the other.
From a barely aged 18 girl (Puncheva) to an overage fatty Missus (Todorova), from two sisters-in-law (Kokanova/Statulova) to an unemployed young housewife (Dimitrova),from a research worker (Toncheva) to an artist's wife (Maneva). The acts are sometimes spiced by jealous husbands as the lawyer Baltiev (Rusev). The rope around the neck of the "Don Juan" tightens. Maybe the reason is in him but maybe in the women, all of whom fight for his attention. The chase is over with drama for all of them, with a thin tread of irony.

Production
Production company:
Studio of Featured Films (SFF) - a Film Unit SREDETS
Director:Ivan Andonov
Writer: Georgi Mishev
Director of Photography: Plamen Vagenshtayn
Music: Georgi Genkov

Filmed: 1980; Premiere: 15.December.1980 

The film was released on DVD in 2000s.

Cast
Stefan Danailov as Yakim Donev, the driving instructor
Georgi Rusev as Baltiev, the lawyer
Nikola Todev as the uncle
Tsvetana Maneva as Pehlivanova
Nevena Kokanova as the older sister-in-law
Mariya Statulova as the younger sister-in-law
Mariana Dimitrova as Mima, Baltiev's wife
Doroteya Toncheva as "Number 7"
Yordanka Kuzmanova as Daneva
Nadya Todorova as Dimitrova
Boryana Puncheva as Anna-Dona
Ilka Zafirova as Stancheva
Ivan Yanchev as Gechev, the private detective

Response
A reported 1,191,037 admissions were recorded for the film in cinemas throughout Bulgaria.

The film was subsumed among the 50 golden Bulgarian films in the book by the journalist Pencho Kovachev. The book was published in 2008 by "Zahariy Stoyanov" publishing house.

There were the following publications:
Bulgarian Film Magazine, vol.6, 1980,p. 5 - by M. Balkanska
New Films Magazine, vol.9-1980,p. 15-18 by E. Gyurkova
Film News Magazine, vol. 10-1980,p. 3 - by V. Delcheva
FILM ART magazine, vol. 1,1981,p. 50-53 - by B. Mihaylov
Film Worker magazine, vol.1-1981,p. 41-44 - by O. Saparev
Film News Magazine, vol. 3-1981,p. 6-7 - by I. Bozhinova

Notes

References
Galina Gencheva, Bulgarian Feature Films vol.3, Dr. Petar Beron 2008 with the Bulgarian Cinematheque
Pencho Kovachev, 50 Golden Bulgarian Films, Zahariy Stoyanov 2008
Bulgarian National Film Archive 
The film in the Bulgarian National Television 
BNT Details

External links
 

1980s Bulgarian-language films
1980 films
Bulgarian comedy films
Films set in Bulgaria
Films shot in Bulgaria
1980 comedy films
Films directed by Ivan Andonov